Juist Airfield is an airfield on the island of Juist in Lower Saxony, Germany. The airport serves regular flights to Norden-Norddeich Airfield on the mainland. , the airfield had up to 500 takeoffs and landings on weekends, the second most aircraft movements in the state of Lower Saxony, after Hannover Airport. The airfield is a critical piece of infrastructure for the island, due to ferry traffic being dependent on the tides.

History
Construction of the airfield started in 1932, finishing with an opening ceremony in 1934. At the time, most traffic was bringing guests to the island's seaside resort. During World War II, control of the airfield was assumed by the Wehrmacht, and anti-aircraft artillery was used to fortify the airfield, though no fighter planes were stationed there. At the end of the war, the airfield was abandoned.

In July 1952, the airfield was reactivated. In 1973, the airfield became the first on the East Frisian Islands to receive a paved runway.

Airlines and destinations
The following airlines offer regular scheduled and charter flights from Juist Airfield:

References

External links
Official website

1934 establishments in Germany
Airports established in 1934
Airports in Lower Saxony